SS Baltic was an ocean liner owned and operated by the White Star Line. Baltic was one of the first four ships ordered by White Star from shipbuilders Harland and Wolff after Thomas Ismay bought the company, and the third of the ships to be delivered.

Name
Originally, the ship was to be named Pacific, and was launched under this name, but was changed to Baltic during her fitting out so as to avoid association with the Collins Liner of the same name, which had vanished with all hands in January 1856.

Career

On 17 October 1871, Baltic ran aground on the Jordan Flats, in Liverpool Bay whilst on a voyage from New York to Liverpool, Lancashire. Her passengers were taken off. She was refloated and taken in to Birkenhead, Cheshire. On 20 November 1872, Baltic rescued the crew of Assyria. On 19 November 1875, Baltic rescued the crew of the full-rigged ship Oriental, which had become waterlogged in the Atlantic Ocean. On 17 August 1880, the steamship Longford collided with her in the River Mersey and sank.

In 1889, after RMS Teutonic entered service, Baltic was sold to the Holland America Line and renamed Veendam after the Dutch city of that name. On 6 February 1898, Veendam hit a derelict ship and sank, with all on board saved.

References

External links
Info from website "Titanic: Voyage of Discovery"

Ocean liners
Ships built in Belfast
Steamships of the United Kingdom
Ships of the White Star Line
1871 ships
Ships built by Harland and Wolff
Maritime incidents in October 1871
Maritime incidents in 1898
Ships sunk in collisions
Ships sunk with no fatalities
Shipwrecks